Cethegus elegans is a species of spider in the genus Cethegus found in Queensland.

References

Euagridae
Spiders described in 1984
Spiders of Australia
Arthropods of Queensland